The seventh season of The Bachelorette, an ABC reality television series, premiered on May 23, 2011. This season featured 27-year-old Ashley Hebert, a dentist from Madawaska, Maine. Hebert finished in third place on season 15 of The Bachelor featuring Brad Womack.  

The season concluded on August 1, 2011, with Hebert accepting a proposal from 34-year-old construction manager J.P. Rosenbaum. The couple married on December 1, 2012, and have two children. In October 2020, Hebert and Rosenbaum announced their separation and subsequently divorced the following year, making them the first Bachelor Nation franchise couple to ever divorce.

Contestants
Biographical information according to ABC official series site, plus footnoted additions.

(ages stated are at time of contest)

Future appearances

The Bachelor
Ben Flajnik was chosen as the bachelor for the sixteenth season of The Bachelor.

Bachelor Pad
Ames Brown, Blake Julian, and William Holman, returned for the second season of Bachelor Pad. Brown quit during week 2. Holman was eliminated during week 4. Julian and his partner, Erica Rose, were eliminated during week 5, finishing in 5th place. 

Nick Peterson returned for the third season of Bachelor Pad. He finished as the sole winner for that season.

Bachelor in Paradise
Peterson returned for the second season of Bachelor in Paradise. He left Paradise in a relationship with his partner, Samantha Steffen.

Other appearances
Jon Ellsworth appeared as a contestant in the Bachelors vs. Bachelorettes special on the season 7 of Wipeout.

Call-out order

 The contestant received the first impression rose
 The contestant received a rose during a date
 The contestant was eliminated
 The contestant was eliminated outside the rose ceremony
 The contestant was eliminated during a date
 The contestant quit the competition
 The previously eliminated contestant asked for a chance to return the competition but denied
 The contestant won the competition

Episodes

After filming
Blake Julian, who finished 7th/8th for this season and is currently married to The Bachelor 12 contestant Holly Durst, whom he met on Bachelor Pad.

Wedding
Hebert and Rosenbaum were married on December 1, 2012, with their wedding airing on ABC on December 16, 2012. They had a garden wedding in Pasadena, California. Their guests from the Bachelor franchise included former Bachelorettes Trista Sutter, with husband Ryan Sutter; Jillian Harris; Emily Maynard; Sean Lowe; and Jason and Molly Mesnick.

Children
On September 30, 2014, the couple welcomed their first child, J.P. tweeted the news that same day. On November 5, 2016 they welcomed their first daughter.

Separation
On October 15, 2020, Ashley and JP announced on social media that they were splitting up after years of trying to make it work.

References

External links
Official website

2011 American television seasons
The Bachelorette (American TV series) seasons
Television shows filmed in California
Television shows shot in the Las Vegas Valley
Television shows filmed in Thailand
Television shows filmed in Hong Kong
Television shows filmed in Taiwan
Television shows filmed in Pennsylvania
Television shows filmed in Georgia (U.S. state)
Television shows filmed in New York (state)
Television shows filmed in Fiji